Charlotte Löwensköld is a 1930 Swedish drama film directed by Gustaf Molander and starring Pauline Brunius, Gertrud Pålson-Wettergren and Birgit Sergelius. It is an adaptation of the 1925 novel Charlotte Löwensköld by Selma Lagerlöf. The film was not considered a success, and no further adaptations of Lagerlöf's work were made in her lifetime. The story was the basis for the 1979 film of the same title.

Cast
 Pauline Brunius as Beate Ekenstedt 
 Gertrud Pålson-Wettergren as Anna Svärd 
 Birgit Sergelius as Charlotte Löwensköld 
 Axel Nilsson as Forsius, vicar 
 Stina Berg as Mrs. Forsius 
 Eric Barclay as Karl-Artur Ekenstedt 
 Urho Somersalmi as Schagerström 
 Kolbjörn Knudsen as Pontus Friman 
 Edith Wallén as Thea Sundler 
 Alfred Lundberg as Bishop

References

Bibliography
 Larsson, Mariah & Marklund, Anders (ed.). Swedish Film: An Introduction and Reader. Nordic Academic Press, 2010.

External links

1930 films
1930 drama films
Swedish drama films
1930s Swedish-language films
Films directed by Gustaf Molander
Films based on Swedish novels
Films based on works by Selma Lagerlöf
Swedish black-and-white films
1930s Swedish films